Endangered Species is the fourth and penultimate album by the Canadian rock band Klaatu, released in mid-1980. It was branded upon release as an attempt at a harder rock and roll sound geared for AOR radio, contrasting with the pop stylings of their previous album Sir Army Suit.

Recording
According to Dave Bradley, "An outside producer was brought in, most of the instruments were played by Los Angeles based session musicians, and the band members were asked to add their voices and (usually) one lead instrument per song. The band was sent home before the album was even mixed." John Woloschuk, bass player of Klaatu, said that all of Dee Long's lead guitar parts were overdubbed by Chris Bond, with the only exception being Long's guitar solo on "Sell Out, Sell Out."

One track on the album ("Sell Out, Sell Out") was a searing attack on Capitol's attempts to "jump on the bandwagon."

Reception
The album was a commercial and critical failure.  As a result, the band was dropped shortly afterwards by Capitol, though Capitol's Canadian division picked up the band and released their final album Magentalane in Canada only.

AllMusic described Endangered Species as a "downright ghastly pop-rock affair", and deemed its songs "dismal".

Artwork
Regular Klaatu artist Ted Jones, who had not painted the cover for the group's previous album Sir Army Suit, returned to paint the album cover.

Track listing

Unreleased songs
The following tracks were recorded but not included on the final album:
”There's Something Happening” (Dee Long) - later released on Sun Set.
”Inflation Blues” (Dee Long)
”C'mon Dance With Me” (Dee Long)
”All Over Morocco” (Terry Draper) - later released by Terry Draper on SoundCloud
”Tribute to Walt Disney” (John Woloschuk)
”I'll Miss You” (John Woloschuk)
”List of Endangered Species” (John Woloschuk and Dino Tome) - later re-recorded and released as "Blue Smoke" on Magentalane.

Personnel
Klaatu
Dee Long - vocals, guitar solo on "Sell Out, Sell Out"
John Woloschuk - vocals, bass, keyboard, guitar
Terry Draper - vocals, drums

Additional musicians
Chris Bond - lead guitar, acoustic guitar, electric guitar, ARP Avatar synth guitar, backing vocals
Leland Sklar - bass guitar
Ed Greene - drums
Jeff Porcaro - drums 
Gary Coleman - percussion
Bobbye Hall - percussion 
Tom Hensley - keyboards
Clarence McDonald - keyboards
Richard Kerr - keyboards
Tom Scott - saxophone and solo on "Hot Box City"
Ernie Watts - sax
Jim Horn - sax
Chuck Findley - trumpet
Sir Rupert Perry - spoken vocals on "Sell Out, Sell Out"

References

Klaatu (band) albums
1980 albums
Capitol Records albums